1900–01 Liverpool F.C. season was the 9th season in the Football League for Liverpool, since their creation in 1892. They finished 1st in the league and were crowned Champions in the Football League, after winning a total of 19 matches. In the FA cup, they were knocked out in the first round, after the 0–2 loss to Notts County.

Results

Football League

FA Cup

References 

Liverpool
Liverpool F.C. seasons
English football championship-winning seasons